Sagit  was an Italian professional cycling team that existed from 1969 to 1970. The team competed in two editions of the Giro d'Italia.

Major wins
1969
 Stage 6 Giro d'Italia, Franco Cortinovis

References

Defunct cycling teams based in Italy
1969 establishments in Italy
1970 disestablishments in Italy
Cycling teams established in 1969
Cycling teams disestablished in 1970